The A4085 is a 20-mile road between Caernarfon and Penrhyndeudraeth in North Wales that runs through the scenic Aberglaslyn Pass. There are several locations where the road is of substandard width.

The road begins at the southern apex of a triangular one-way system in Caernarfon on the A487. It heads south, signposted for Beddgelert. As it leaves Caernarfon it passes the site of the Roman legionary fort Segontium and later crosses the Afon Seiont and the course of the Caernarfon-to-Llanberis railway. After 1.5 miles it crosses a roundabout at Caeathro. The road as far as Waunfawr is reputed to be a Roman road and is fairly straight. After Waunfawr the road joins the Gwyrfai Valley, a glaciated U-shaped valley along the west side of Snowdon. At four places along the valley it crosses and recrosses the Welsh Highland Railway. The road passes along the east shore of Llyn Cwellyn (Caernarfon's water supply), before climbing to a summit just south of Rhyd Ddu.

The summit of the pass is at Pitt's Head and then the road and railway drop to Beddgelert and the Aberglaslyn Pass, where the road is concurrent with the A498. The A4085 is the major road at the junction.

The railway crosses the road again at the head of the Aberglaslyn Pass and can be seen again in the Pass on the east bank of the Afon Glaslyn, while the road continues along the west bank. The A4085 road diverges to the left at Pont Aberglaslyn before taking a winding route mostly following old sea cliffs of the Afon Glaslyn estuary. It passes under the Welsh Highland Railway again at Nantmor. After Garreg, the road climbs over a hill and crosses the Ffestiniog Railway by level crossing. It then takes a narrow winding descent through Penrhyndeudraeth to rejoin the A487 at the crossroads in the middle of the village.

History 
The road was created from early toll roads. The toll road between Pont Cae'r Gors and a point a mile to the south followed an easier 1 in 20 gradient than the steep farm track to the west that preceded it. There was some improvement in the 1960s and 1970s halfway between Pont Aberglaslyn and Garreg and in 2005 nearer to Garreg. Just south of the Goat Hotel in Beddgelert is an arched railway overbridge (with height and width restrictions) built by the Portmadoc, Beddgelert and South Snowdon Railway but never used.

References

Roads in Gwynedd